This article is a list of all 86 episodes of High School! Kimengumi, an anime television series based on a manga series of the same title by Motoei Shinzawa.  The Kimengumi TV series began airing in Japan on 12 October 1985 at 7:30pm on the Fuji TV Network in Japan. The series ran for two years, with episode 86 airing on 21 September 1987.

A 51-minute movie by the same title was released by Toei in Japan on 12 July 1986. Neither the movie nor the TV series has been licensed for release in any English-speaking country.

Summary of series
Each episode is about 25 minutes long, and some are split into two unrelated mini-episodes.

TV series (1985-1987)

Movie (1986)
The Kimengumi movie has only been commercially released on Japanese VHS.

See also
High School! Kimengumi

References
 General
 
 

 Specific

High School! Kimengumi
Episodes